Falcuna gitte, the Gitte's marble, is a butterfly in the family Lycaenidae. It is found in western Nigeria. The habitat consists of primary forests and dense secondary growth.

References

Endemic fauna of Nigeria
Butterflies described in 1969
Poritiinae